Operational Service Medal may refer to:

 Operational Service Medal (Canada), a campaign medal established in 2010
 Operational Service Medal (United Kingdom), the overall name given to a group of campaign medals awarded to the British Armed Forces:
 Operational Service Medal for Afghanistan
 Operational Service Medal for the Democratic Republic of Congo
 Operational Service Medal for Sierra Leone
 Operational Service Medal Iraq and Syria
 Australian Operational Service Medal, a campaign medal established in 2012
 New Zealand Operational Service Medal, a campaign medal established in 2002
 International Operational Service Medal, a military decoration awarded since 2016 by the Government of Ireland